Henry Brougham may refer to:

Henry Brougham (divine) (1665–1696), English cleric
Henry Brougham (landowner) (1742–1810), landowner in north-west England
Henry Brougham, 1st Baron Brougham and Vaux (1778–1868), son of the above
Henry Brougham, 3rd Baron Brougham and Vaux (1836–1927), British noble and civil servant
Henry Brougham (sportsman) (1888–1923), British racquets, rugby and cricket player
Henry Brougham (priest) (died 1913), Dean of Lismore
Henry Brougham (fictional character), character in the 1947 film The Bishop's Wife

See also